Manquin is an unincorporated community in King William County, Virginia, United States.

Horn Quarter and Mount Columbia are listed on the National Register of Historic Places.

References

Unincorporated communities in Virginia
Unincorporated communities in King William County, Virginia